Udyogamandal School is a school for ages Kindergarten to Grade 12 located in Udyogamandal, Eloor, Kochi, India. It was established in 1965 by the management of Fertilisers and Chemicals Travancore Limited (FACT), the largest public sector firm in Kerala. It was established to providing education to the children of FACT employees. Udyogamandal School is affiliated to the ICSE board, New Delhi.

History
The school started off in a small building where the Udyogamandal nursery currently functions. It was started in 1968.

References	 
Kochi: Udyogamandal School, Udyogamandal, The Hindu newspaper

Educational institutions established in 1965
Schools in Ernakulam district
1965 establishments in Kerala